Rantzau is an Amt ("collective municipality") in the district of Pinneberg, in Schleswig-Holstein, Germany. It is situated around Barmstedt, which is the seat of the Amt, but not part of it. The Amt was named after the County of Rantzau, which existed between 1649 and 1864.

Subdivision
The Amt ("collective municipality") Rantzau consists of the following municipalities:

Bevern 
Bilsen 
Bokholt-Hanredder 
Bullenkuhlen 
Ellerhoop 
Groß Offenseth-Aspern 
Heede 
Hemdingen 
Langeln 
Lutzhorn

References 

Ämter in Schleswig-Holstein

tr:Rantzau